In enzymology, a D-2-hydroxy-acid dehydrogenase is an enzyme that catalyzes the chemical reaction

(R)-lactate + acceptor  pyruvate + reduced acceptor

Thus, the two substrates of this enzyme are (R)-lactate and acceptor, whereas its two products are pyruvate and reduced acceptor.

This enzyme belongs to the family of oxidoreductases, specifically those acting on the CH-OH group of donor with other acceptors. The systematic name of this enzyme class is (R)-2-hydroxy-acid:acceptor 2-oxidoreductase. Other names in common use include D-2-hydroxy acid dehydrogenase, and (R)-2-hydroxy-acid:(acceptor) 2-oxidoreductase. It has 2 cofactors: FAD, and Zinc.

References

 
 
 

EC 1.1.99
Flavoproteins
Zinc enzymes
Enzymes of unknown structure
Protein families